Butalene is a polycyclic hydrocarbon composed of two fused cyclobutadiene rings. A reported possible synthesis of it involves an elimination reaction from a Dewar benzene derivative. The structure itself can be envisioned as benzene with an internal bridge, and calculations indicate it is somewhat less stable than the open 1,4-didehydrobenzene biradical, the valence isomer in which that bridged bond is broken.

Structure and bonding 

Ab initio calculations indicate butalene has a planar geometry and, in keeping with a planar structure with 6 π-electron configuration, is aromatic. Thus, the most significant π bonding interactions involve conjugation around the periphery of the whole six-atom structure, similar to benzene, rather than cross-ring resonance along the bridging bond. Significant resonance around one or the other four-membered ring alone would be a less-stable antiaromatic form, as is seen in cyclobutadiene itself.

See also 
Propalene
Pentalene
Heptalene
Octalene

References

Polycyclic aromatic hydrocarbons
Bicyclic compounds
Four-membered rings